Land of Peace (translit. Ard al-Salam) is a 1957 Egyptian war/drama film directed by Kamal El Sheikh. It starred Omar Sharif and Faten Hamama. In this film, most of the characters speak Palestinian Arabic.

Plot 
The film takes place in Palestine and portrays the lives of freedom fighters trying to free their village from the control of the Israelis. Ahmed (Omar Sharif) is an Egyptian freedom fighter who ends up in this village. There, he meets Salma, a girl from the village. Together they try to save the Palestinians and always escape danger. Their friendship evolves into a love relationship and they marry each other.

Cast 
Faten Hamama as Salma
Omar Sharif as Ahmed
Abdel Salam Al Nabulsy as Hamdan
Tewfik El Dekn as Khalid
Abdel Waress Assar as Mazen (Salma's father)
Fakher Fakher as Abed
Faida Kamel as neighbor and a singer
Ehsan Sherif as Rukaya

References

External links 

1957 films
1950s Arabic-language films
Israeli–Palestinian conflict films
Films directed by Kamal El Sheikh
War romance films
1957 romantic drama films
Egyptian romantic drama films